Raymond James Pettine (July 6, 1912 – November 17, 2003) was a United States district judge of the United States District Court for the District of Rhode Island.

Education and career
Born in Providence, Rhode Island, Pettine received a Bachelor of Laws from Boston University School of Law in 1937 and a Master of Laws from the same institution in 1940. He was in the United States Army during World War II, from 1941 to 1946, thereafter remaining in the United States Army Reserve until 1966, achieving the rank of colonel in the Judge Advocate General's Corps. He was in private practice in Providence from 1946 to 1961. He was special counsel to the State Attorney General of Rhode Island from 1948 to 1952. He was an assistant state attorney general of Rhode Island from 1952 to 1961. He was the United States Attorney for the District of Rhode Island from 1961 to 1966.

Federal judicial service

On June 13, 1966, Pettine was nominated by President Lyndon B. Johnson to a new seat on the United States District Court for the District of Rhode Island created by 80 Stat. 75. He was confirmed by the United States Senate on June 29, 1966, and received his commission the same day. He served as Chief Judge from 1971 to 1982, assuming senior status on July 6, 1982. Pettine served in that capacity until his death on November 17, 2003, in Dallas, Texas.

References

Sources
 

1912 births
2003 deaths
United States Attorneys for the District of Rhode Island
Judges of the United States District Court for the District of Rhode Island
United States district court judges appointed by Lyndon B. Johnson
20th-century American judges
United States Army colonels
United States Army reservists
United States Army Judge Advocate General's Corps